Pseudo-spectral methods, also known as discrete variable representation (DVR) methods, are a class of numerical methods used in applied mathematics and scientific computing for the solution of partial differential equations. They are closely related to spectral methods, but complement the basis by an additional pseudo-spectral basis, which allows representation of functions on a quadrature grid. This simplifies the evaluation of certain operators, and can considerably speed up the calculation when using fast algorithms such as the fast Fourier transform.

Motivation with a concrete example

Take the initial-value problem

with periodic conditions . This specific example is the Schrödinger equation for a particle in a potential , but the structure is more general. In many practical partial differential equations, one has a term that involves derivatives (such as a kinetic energy contribution), and a multiplication with a function (for example, a potential).

In the spectral method, the solution  is expanded in a suitable set of basis functions, for example plane waves,

Insertion and equating identical coefficients yields a set of ordinary differential equations for the coefficients,

where the elements  are calculated through the explicit Fourier-transform

In general, this is done by numerical methods, such as Runge–Kutta methods. For the numerical solutions, the right-hand side of the ordinary differential equation has to be evaluated repeatedly at different time steps. At this point, the spectral method has a major problem with the potential term .

Also, the matrix elements  need to be evaluated explicitly before the differential equation for the coefficients can be solved, which requires an additional step.

In the pseudo-spectral method, this term is evaluated differently. Given the coefficients , an inverse discrete Fourier transform yields the value of the function  at discrete grid points . At these grid points, the function is then multiplied, and the result Fourier-transformed back. This yields a new set of coefficients  that are used instead of the matrix product .

It can be shown that both methods have similar accuracy. Also, the function  can be used directly without evaluating any additional integrals.

Technical discussion

To simplify the notation, the time-dependence is dropped. Conceptually, it consists of three steps:

  are expanded in a finite set of basis functions (this is the spectral method).
 For a given set of basis functions, a quadrature is sought that converts scalar products of these basis functions into a weighted sum over grid points.
 The product is calculated by multiplying  at each grid point.

Expansion in a basis

The functions  can be expanded in a finite basis  as

For simplicity, let the basis be orthogonal and normalized,  using the inner product  with appropriate boundaries . The coefficients are then obtained by

A bit of calculus yields then

This forms the basis of the spectral method.

Quadrature

For a given basis  and number of  basis functions, one can try to find a quadrature, i.e., a set of  points and weights such that

Special examples are the Gaussian quadrature for polynomials and the Discrete Fourier Transform for plane waves. It should be stressed that the grid points and weights,  are a function of the basis and the number .

The quadrature allows an alternative numerical representation of the function  through their value at the grid points. This representation is sometimes denoted Discrete Variable Representation (DVR), and is completely equivalent to the expansion in the basis.

Multiplication

The multiplication with the function  is then done at each grid point,

This generally introduces an additional approximation. To see this, we can calculate one of the coefficients :

However, using the spectral method, the same coefficient would be . The pseudo-spectral method thus introduces the additional approximation

If the product  can be represented with the given finite set of basis functions, the above equation is exact due to the chosen quadrature.

Special pseudospectral schemes

The Fourier method

If periodic boundary conditions with period  are imposed on the system, the basis functions can be generated by plane waves,

Thus, qualitatively, if the functions  can be represented sufficiently accurately with  basis functions, the pseudo-spectral method gives accurate results if  basis functions are used.

An expansion in plane waves often has a poor quality and needs many basis functions to converge. As a consequence, plane waves are one of the most common expansion that is encountered with pseudo-spectral methods.

Polynomials

Another common expansion is into classical polynomials. Here, the Gaussian quadrature is used, which states that one can always find weights  and points  such that

holds for any polynomial  of degree  or less. Typically, the weight function  and ranges  are chosen for a specific problem, and leads to one of the different forms of the quadrature. To apply this to the pseudo-spectral method, we choose basis functions , with  being a polynomial of degree  with the property

Under these conditions, the  form an orthonormal basis with respect to the scalar product . This basis, together with the quadrature points can then be used for the pseudo-spectral method.

Such polynomials occur naturally in several standard problems. For example, the quantum harmonic oscillator is ideally expanded in Hermite polynomials, and Jacobi-polynomials can be used to define the associated Legendre functions typically appearing in rotational problems.

References

 
 
 
 Jie Shen, Tao Tang and Li-Lian Wang (2011) "Spectral Methods: Algorithms, Analysis and Applications" (Springer Series in Computational Mathematics, V. 41, Springer), .
 
 
 
 
 
 

Numerical analysis